The Corniche des Crêtes is a picturesque and narrow coastal road in the south of France, winding from Cassis to La Ciotat along the Mediterranean shore.

The road was opened to traffic in 1969 and it leads along the Falaises (high cliffs) up to Cap Canaille, a cape 362 metres above the sea, and the highest cliff in France. From there it continues to Grande Tête, an elevation which is 399 metres high.

The Corniche des Crêtes is about 15 km long and offers magnificent views of the sea, as well as the town of Cassis and the Calanques.

1969 establishments in France
Bouches-du-Rhône
Roads in France
Transport in Provence-Alpes-Côte d'Azur
Massif des Calanques